Mary Anita Ware (born November 3, 1951) is an American politician, social justice activist, and businesswoman serving as a member of the Kansas Senate for the 25th Senate district in Wichita, Kansas.

Career 
She was elected to the Senate in December 2018 by Democratic Party precinct committee members to succeed Democrat Lynn Rogers, who stepped down to become lieutenant governor of Kansas. In 2020, Ware was elected to a full term in her own right, defeating Republican Vail Fruechting by a margin of 55% to 45% in the general election. Outside of her work in the Kansas Legislature, Ware owns a CBD store, American Shaman Botanicals, in Wichita.

References

Living people
Democratic Party Kansas state senators
Women state legislators in Kansas
Politicians from Wichita, Kansas
21st-century American politicians
21st-century American women politicians
1951 births